The Valley Eagle was a named streamliner passenger train of the Missouri Pacific Railroad that began in 1948. It ran from Houston, Texas's Union Station to Brownsville, Texas at the Mexico–United States border and a second section to Corpus Christi. It first carried the numbers #11 south and #12 northbound and in later years carried the number of #321 south and #322 heading north. 

It made coordinated connections in Houston with trains from St. Louis (Texas Eagle #21/22), from Memphis (#201/202) and from New Orleans (Houstonian #309/310). The Valley Eagle had its final run in 1962.

Night train counterpart
The Missouri Pacific Railroad also operated the Pioneer, a night train counterpart that outlasted the Valley Eagle. After the Pioneer lost its sleeping car and its name, it continued to 1965 or 1966 as an unnamed night train on the route.

External link
Photo of the Valley Eagle departing Houston Union Station, 1953

Notes

Named passenger trains of the United States
Passenger rail transportation in Texas
Passenger trains of the Missouri Pacific Railroad
Railway services introduced in 1948
Railway services discontinued in 1962